The Liberal Party of Australia held a leadership spill on 10 March 1971. Prime Minister John Gorton called for a vote of confidence in his leadership, which was tied, prompting Gorton to resign. William McMahon subsequently defeated Billy Snedden for the leadership, and was sworn in as prime minister on the same day. Gorton was elected as his deputy, defeating Malcolm Fraser and David Fairbairn.

Background
On 8 March 1971, Defence Minister Malcolm Fraser resigned from cabinet, supposedly over Gorton's failure to support him in a dispute with Chief of the General Staff Thomas Daly. The following day, Fraser gave a statement to the House of Representatives in which he excoriated Gorton and called him "not fit to hold the great office of prime minister". Fraser's actions brought to a head tensions over Gorton's leadership style, particularly what his opponents viewed as his lack of consultation with cabinet. In response, Gorton called a partyroom meeting for 10 a.m. on 10 March.

Meeting
The partyroom meeting began with an open debate on the leadership. Gorton, who was chairing the meeting, then called for a vote of confidence in his leadership, which was tied at 33 votes in favour and 33 votes opposed. Gorton supporter Duke Bonnett was the only absentee (due to illness); had he been present, Gorton would have received 34 votes. Under party rules of the time, Gorton could have retained the leadership. However, Gorton resigned, saying a tie vote was not a vote of confidence. He turned to Foreign Affairs Minister William McMahon and nominated him for the leadership, to the applause of his colleagues; Billy Snedden, the Minister for Labour and National Service, was the only other nominee. McMahon – who had been deputy leader of the Liberal Party since 1966 – defeated Snedden with what The Canberra Times called "a comparatively small majority". The exact result was kept secret, as was the party's practice at the time, but has been estimated to have been 40 votes for McMahon to 26 for Snedden.

After McMahon was elected as leader, there was a second ballot to elect his successor as deputy leader. Somewhat unexpectedly, Gorton put himself forward as a candidate and was elected, defeating Malcolm Fraser and backbencher David Fairbairn. McMahon was sworn in as prime minister by Governor-General Paul Hasluck later that afternoon; his full ministry was not sworn in until 22 March.

Candidates
 William McMahon, incumbent Deputy Leader, Minister for Foreign Affairs, Member for Lowe
 Billy Snedden, Minister for Labour and National Service, Member for Bruce

Results

The following table gives the ballot result:

Leadership ballot

Deputy leadership ballot

Aftermath
Gorton was sacked from cabinet for disloyalty in August 1971, and subsequently resigned the deputy leadership and was replaced by Snedden. McMahon lost the December 1972 federal election to the Labor Party, led by Gough Whitlam.

See also
 McMahon Government

References

Liberal Party of Australia leadership spills
March 1971 events in Australia
1971 elections in Australia
Liberal Party of Australia leadership spill